Epicephala australis is a moth of the family Gracillariidae. It is known from Queensland, Australia.

The larvae feed on Acacia longifolia. They probably mine the leaves of their host plant.

References

Epicephala
Moths described in 1896